ICAR-Central Research Institute for Jute and Allied Fibers (ICAR-CRIJAF), established in 1953 as Jute Agricultural Research Institute (JARI), is only research institute on jute & allied fibres crops in India and is a constituent unit of Indian Council of Agricultural Research (ICAR) an Autonomous Body under Department of Agricultural Research & Education (DARE) under Ministry of Agriculture and Farmers Welfare Government of India. This institute is located in Barrackpore, Kolkata, West Bengal, India.

Central Sericultural Research and Training Institute

References

External links
https://crijaf.icar.gov.in/

Research institutes in Kolkata
Multidisciplinary research institutes
Educational institutions established in 1953
1953 establishments in West Bengal
Research institutes in West Bengal